Hafren (or Sabre, Sabren, or Sabrina;) is a legendary British princess who was drowned in the River Severn by her repudiated stepmother Gwendolen. The legend appears in Geoffrey of Monmouth's pseudohistorical chronicle Historia Regum Britanniae. According to Geoffrey, Hafren is the eponym of the Severn, which bears one of Britain's most ancient river names (recorded as early as the 2nd century in the Latinized form Sabrina).

Historia Regum Britanniae
In Geoffrey of Monmouth's Historia Regum Britanniae, Hafren (who Geoffrey calls Sabre) was the beautiful daughter of King Locrin of the Britons by his secret lover, a Germanic princess named Estrildis. Her mother had been abducted by Humber the Hun and brought to Britain during their invasion following King Brutus' death; eventually the Hun invasion was suppressed by Locrin, Brutus' eldest son, who fell in love with Estrildis upon discovering her in one of Humber's ships.

Locrin had been forced into a "diplomatic" marriage to Gwendolen, the daughter of King Corineus of Cornwall, but upon the death of Corineus, Locrin divorced her and made Estrildis his queen—thereby legitimizing Sabre. Locrin's scorned first wife, the mother of his heir Maddan, raised a Cornish army against him, defeated him in battle, and had his widow and daughter drowned in the River Severn:

Welsh tradition
A different version of the story is recorded in Oliver Mathews' Towne of Sallop (1616). In this version, Hafren's mother Estrildis is called Sŵs-wên, and Locrinus builds the town of Caersws for her around 1086 BC, where she gives birth to Hafren (called Haverwen or Havfren) out of wedlock. Locrinus marries Sŵs-wên after the death of Corineus, causing Gwendolen to raise an army and kill Locrinus. Gwendolen then travels to Caersws, razes it to the ground, kills both Sŵs-wên and Haverwen, and throws their bodies into the River Severn, which the Britons then name Haverne after Haverwen. It claims that the Romans later called them Eistride and Sabrina or Severne.

According to local legends reported by the antiquarian Thomas Pennant, Hafren was drowned at Dolforwyn Castle;  literally means  in Welsh.

Richard Williams Morgan drew on the previous two stories, and expanded them in The British Kymry (1857). In it, Locrinus builds a palace for Estrildis (who Morgan says was also known as Susa) at Caersws, where he concealed her for seven years with the help of his brother Camber. Hafren (called Sabra) is born, and is even more beautiful than Estrildis, rivalling her ancestor Venus (Locrinus was a descendant of Venus' son Aeneas). When Corineus dies, Gwendolen's army fights Locrinus' forces at the River Stour, and after killing him she hurries to Caersws and seizes Estrildis and Sabra. She orders Estrildis to be killed immediately, but was "so moved by the supernatural loveliness of Sabra, that many days elapsed before she could be persuaded to condemn her to death". Sabra was then taken to a meadow by Gwendolen's guards, and cast into the River Severn.

In literature

Edmund Spenser retold the story in book two, canto ten of his poem The Faerie Queene (1590). Estrild and Sabrina flee Guendolene, who catches them at the River Severn, killing Estrild, but casting "the faire Sabrina almost dead with feare" into the river to drown.

The Welsh tale of Hafren (variously referred to as Averne, Sabre, Sabren, Sabrina, etc.) was adapted by Milton for his masque Comus (1634), in which the following verses are addressed to the water nymph "Sabrina":

In art
Several statues of Sabrina were made, including by Peter Hollins (1846), Holme Cardwell (1865), three by William Calder Marshall (including Amherst College's Statue of Sabrina), John Graham Lough, and others.

See also
 Sabrina Way, a long distance footpath
 2264 Sabrina, a minor planet named after Hafren

References

External links
 "Tales of the Riverbank: The Legend of Sabrina" from BBC Radio 3's The Essay

British traditional history
Executed royalty
People executed by drowning
River Severn
Welsh folklore
Personifications of rivers
Sea and river goddesses